Jarella is a fictional character appearing in American comic books published by Marvel Comics. Along with Betty Ross Banner and Caiera, she was one of the Hulk's great loves. The character was introduced in The Incredible Hulk vol. 2 #140 (May 1971). Jarella was created by Roy Thomas, Herb Trimpe and American science fiction author Harlan Ellison, who was the guest writer for that issue.

Publication history
Jarella first appeared in The Incredible Hulk vol. 2 #140 (June 1971) as a one-off character in a plot by guest writer Harlan Ellison. She was brought back in issue #148, another tale by a guest plotter, in this case Chris Claremont in his first published story. Though Jarella's actual appearances would continue to be sporadic, she became a major driving force in the plot and characterizations of the Hulk for several years.

Jarella is killed in The Incredible Hulk vol. 2 #205 (November 1976). Though it sparked an outpouring of protest from readers who shared the Hulk's grief, writer Len Wein has said that he never intended Jarella's death to be permanent: "[It] was my intention that Jarella was not really dead. Being an alien species, what appeared to be death to us was in fact a step in what was to be her metamorphosis into a higher power. I never got a chance to bring her back before I left the title, and thus she’s remained dead".

Fictional character biography

Jarella was the princess of the sub-atomic world of K'ai. Although outwardly primitive, her world has remnants of long-forgotten high technology and sorcery. Its people are green-skinned and for the most part blonde haired, but otherwise humanoid.

Jarella's city is threatened by a number of menaces ranging from attacks by the gigantic  (warthog-like beasts) to the armies of the warlord Visus. The people come out to greet him, and the Hulk is especially taken with the lovely and gentle Jarella. She leads him into the city and calls on her sorcerers to help the Hulk learn their language. The spell succeeds and also allows the human personality of Bruce Banner to emerge in the Hulk's body. The Hulk and Jarella fall in love and she proclaims him her husband. After Visus attempts to assassinate Jarella she exiles him from the city. However, Psyklop snatches the Hulk away from K'ai.

Jarella is soon transported to Earth by the Pantheon of Sorcerers (Torla, Holi, Moli; also known as the Sorcerer's Triad) to retrieve the Hulk. This act inadvertently causes solar storms; she battles Fialin and then returns to K'ai. She loses another war against Visi and is taken captive. The Hulk returns to K'ai, and Jarella and Hulk defeat Visis and the assassin Krylar.

Jarella accepts the Hulk unconditionally. She realizes that Bruce Banner's mind is in the Hulk's body but is equally accepting of the Hulk personality, or Banner's body.

Alongside the Hulk, Jarella battles Psyklop once more. Hulk and Jarella are then returned to Earth by Doc Samson. During a battle between the Hulk and Crypto-Man in an unnamed town in New Mexico, Jarella saves a child from a collapsing wall, but is crushed to death herself. The Hulk takes Jarella's body to the Gamma Base, but the doctors are unable to revive her. The Hulk rampages in search for his friend, the magician Doctor Strange, but the latter is also unable to restore her, and he finally accepts that Jarella is dead, while being comforted by the Valkyrie. Captain Mar-Vell shrinks the Hulk so that he can return Jarella's body to K'ai for a proper burial. After being put to rest, her spirit takes farewell by creating a single green flower.

During the Chaos War, queen Jarella is revived to assist the Hulk in fighting Abomination, a Zom-possessed Doctor Strange, and the forces of Amatsu-Mikaboshi. After the Hulk and allies were nearly defeated by his undead father Brian Banner (empowered into the Devil Hulk through all the fear and rage that Hulk felt towards him over the years), she saves her husband and helps to defeat Brian. Bruce's similarly returned mother tells him that although she disliked his other wife Red She-Hulk, she definitely likes Jarella yet both of them soon will have to leave again.

Powers and abilities
Jarella was athletic with the strength of a normal human but was a skilled sword-fighter, strategist and equestrian. She would ride horse-like steeds and winged serpent-creatures indigenous to K'ai.

After her death, she was empowered by all the positive feelings that Hulk had felt towards her, and as he drew his power from emotions, she gained superhuman physical prowess exceeding his regular state.

Reception
The character was ranked 68th in Comics Buyer's Guide's "100 Sexiest Women in Comics" list.

References

Comics characters introduced in 1971
Characters created by Harlan Ellison
Characters created by Herb Trimpe
Characters created by Roy Thomas
Fictional princesses
Fictional swordfighters in comics
Marvel Comics aliens
Marvel Comics extraterrestrial superheroes
Marvel Comics female superheroes